Malvern Ulysses Griffin (June 21, 1889 – June 12, 1950) was a college football player.

Vanderbilt University
He was a prominent tackle for the Vanderbilt Commodores football team of Vanderbilt University.

1909
Griffin was selected All-Southern by John Heisman in 1909.

University of Alabama
He later attended the University of Alabama.

References

Sportspeople from Huntsville, Alabama
All-Southern college football players
American football tackles
Vanderbilt Commodores football players
1889 births
1950 deaths